The Banca Ifis S.p.A. Group (Istituto di Finanziamento e Sconto) is an Italian finance company that specialises in lending services to undertakings, and acquiring/servicing non-performing loan portfolios.

Founded in 1983 by Sebastien Egon Fürstenberg, son of Clara Agnelli, Banca Ifis has been listed on the Milan Stock Exchange (FTSE Italia STAR segment) since 2003.

History

The origins 
I.Fi.S., financial intermediary for factoring for small enterprises in Italy, was founded in 1983 in Genoa, where Sebastien Egon Fürstenberg, founder of the company and the current President, resided at the time.

I.Fi.S was established in Genoa as a financial intermediary mainly for the acquisition of trade receivables and the provision of financing in the form of factoring. I.Fi.S. is the captive company of the Americanino group: it helps finance the suppliers of the denim company and liquidate customer receivables.

2002-2004: listing on the Stock Exchange 
In 2002 Banca Ifis was authorised to carry out banking activities, and it changed its name from Ifis to Banca Ifis SpA. The same year, it became a Bank and joined Factor Chain International to operate on a global level, after opening its branches in Romania and Poland. 
In 2003 Banca Ifis was admitted to the MTA (Mercato Telematico Azionario, the Online Stock Market), and in 2004 it entered the  segment.

2008-2013: growth and diversification 
The Bank's strategy is based on increasing its market share through the development of its historic core business: financial and management support for Small and Medium Enterprises (SMEs) in Italy and abroad. In 2008 Banca Ifis entered the world of retail with the launch of Rendimax, the high-yield online savings account. In 2013, it expanded its offer with the Contomax online current account.

About the same time, Banca Ifis also branched out into what would become its second core business: the purchase and management of impaired loans by acquiring Toscana Finanza in 2011.

2016-2020: acquisitions season 
In 2016 Banca Ifis acquired Ge Capital Interbanca for 119 million Euro (with one billion of assets), entering the fields of leasing, medium-term lending and structured finance. Banca d'Italia acknowledged the operation on 29 November of the same year.

In 2018, development continued in the area of Non Performing Loans (NPL): Ifis Npl S.p.A., a joint-stock company established following the spin-off of the Npl Area of Banca Ifis, became fully operational, 100% controlled by the parent company. In 2018 the Bank entered the pharmacy lending sector, acquiring 70% of Credifarma S.p.A., a company jointly held by Italian Federfarma. The same year, it acquired Cap.Ital.Fin. S.p.A., a financial intermediary specialised in personal salary-backed loans.

In January 2019 Banca Ifis purchased FBS S.p.A., a company that operates in the NPL sector as a specialist in servicing activities, for €58.5 million, which today is included in Ifis Npl. 

The Central Business Department was set up in 2019, bringing together all the business areas aimed at supporting enterprises. In October 2019 Banca Ifis completed the purchase of 10% of the remaining share capital of the subsidiary FBS S.p.A. and became its sole shareholder, consolidating its position as a major player in the market of non-performing loans in Italy.

In April 2020 the Banca Ifis Group formed a new vision of NPLs: the names of FBS S.p.A. and FBS Real Estate S.p.A.were changed to Ifis Npl Servicing S.p.A. and Ifis Real Estate S.p.A. The companies of the new Banca Ifis NPL Division were created with the aim of making the organisation more efficient and allowing it to effectively seize the best opportunities on the market.

Banca Ifis announced that it had successfully completed the competitive process for the purchase of 70.77% of the share capital of Farbanca S.p.A.

2021: Npl area reorganization 
On 1 January 2021 corporate reorganisation was completed in the Npl area, creating a vertical chain to guarantee the separation and independence between credit purchase and collection activities.

Since April 2021 Frederik Geertman becomes the new Chief Executive Officer of the Group.

2022: creation of Banca Credifarma
In April 2022, the merger by incorporation of Credifarma into Farbanca, which was approved in February, ends with the creation of Banca Credifarma, the first specialised pole in financial services to pharmacies.

Financial data

Market share  
Banca Ifis is the fifth national operator in factoring in terms of turnover, with a market share of 5%, after Gruppo Intesa Sanpaolo (25%), Unicredit (22%), Ifitalia (12%), Factorit (6%).
Banca Ifis holds a 2% market share in leasing, positioning itself after Unicredit Leasing (15%), Gruppo Intesa Sanpaolo (13%), BNP Paribas Leasing Solution (9%), Alba Leasing (7%), Gruppo Iccrea BancaImpresa (7%), Ubi Leasing (6%), Société Generale Equipment Finance (5%), MPS Leasing & Factoring (4%), BPER Leasing - Sardaleasing (4%), Credemleasing (4%), Crédit Agricole Leasing (3%), Selmabipiemme Leasing (2%) and DDL Group (2%).  While Banca Ifis is a leader in electric car leasing  
In the NPL segment, Banca Ifis is the fourth largest national operator in terms of assets under management with €24.4 billion worth of these preceded by doValue (80.2 billion Euro), Intrum Italia (41.0) and Cerved (34.6).

Shareholders 
The shareholding structure communicated to Consob is as follows. The shareholding percentages are notified by the shareholders, in accordance with the provisions of article 120 of the Consolidated text of the provisions on financial intermediation (TUF). Minor parts of the shareholder structure can be indicated directly by the company through other sources. The share capital of Banca Ifis is equal to 53,811,095 Euro, divided into 53,811,095 ordinary shares with a par value of 1 euro. The following table shows Banca Ifis's shareholders that, either directly or indirectly, own equity instruments with voting rights representing over 3% of Banca Ifis's share capital (data updated on 5 December 2022):

References 

Banks of Italy
Companies based in Veneto
Banks established in 1983
Italian companies established in 1983